Museum is a subway station on Line 1 Yonge–University in Toronto, Ontario, Canada. It opened in 1963 and is located under Queen's Park at Charles Street West, beside the Royal Ontario Museum after which it is named. Wi-Fi service is available at this station.

Structure

The station structure was created in the middle of the road using cut and cover, while immediately south of the station the line goes into a bored tunnel to run under Queen's Park, passing east of the Ontario Legislative Building to reach Queen's Park station. The concourse is located under the roadway, one level above the north end of a centre platform, with entrances from either side of the road. There are two stairways on the west side adjacent to the southern end of the Royal Ontario Museum and two on the east, just south of Charles Street. Pedestrians are encouraged to use the station as a pedestrian underpass to cross Queen's Park, a wide and busy thoroughfare without a centre median. This station does not have an elevator and is not wheelchair accessible.

When plans for the adjacent and now closed McLaughlin Planetarium were drawn up in the mid-1960s, a tunnel that would lead directly to the Planetarium was contemplated, but this plan was scrapped as being too expensive.

In August 2022, construction started on a second entrance to the south end of Museum station that will also make the station accessible. The new entrance will be located at the north end of Queens Park Circle on the south side of the War Memorial monument. The entrance will have elevator access to a new concourse level providing access to a second elevator to the platform level.

Connection to Line 2 Bloor–Danforth
 and  stations each have four parallel tracks, two above two.  Between these stations and Museum is a full double-track, grade-separated wye junction. The tracks to/from Museum connect to the upper St. George and Lower Bay stations, while the tracks along Bloor use lower St. George and upper Bay.

The decision by Metro Council in 1960 to build a wye from the University line to the eastbound Bloor line between Museum and Bay stations was a controversial one. TTC Chairman Clarence Downey opposed the construction, estimated to cost about $10 million, saying that $10 million would build an extra mile of subway on the Bloor–Danforth line. The construction was estimated to cost $3 million for the basic interchange, and $7 million for the “intricate trackage system”.

From February to September 1966, all three sides of the wye were used in regular service: from each of three terminals—, and —trains ran alternately to the other two (between Eglinton and Museum via ). The tunnel to Lower Bay is visible from northbound trains shortly after they leave Museum Station.

Architecture and art

The station opened with the same tile scheme which would become standard on Line 2 Bloor–Danforth, whose first phase was completed three years later in 1966. Smooth, unadorned cream-coloured rectangular tiles were predominant, with a strip of narrower blue tiles near the ceiling. The unique TTC font was used for the station name, sandblasted to the wall and painted in the same shade of blue as the narrower strip of tiles.

Designed by Diamond and Schmitt Architects and constructed by Jeviso Construction Corporation, renovations to the station's platform level were completed in April 2008 to evoke exhibits in the Royal Ontario Museum. Supporting columns have been remade to resemble the ancient Egyptian deity Osiris, as well as Toltec warriors, Doric columns found in the Parthenon, China's Forbidden City columns, and Indigenous Northwest Coast house posts. This renovation purged Museum Station's original tile scheme from the platform level. Walls were reclad with mauve aluminum plate panels by Ontario Panelization of London, Ontario. They incorporated painted 1/4" fire-rated Lexan into the panels composing the large "MUSEUM" lettering on the walls with a historical hieroglyphic inscription from the ROM.

Nearby landmarks
In addition to its proximity to the Royal Ontario Museum, other landmarks nearby include the Gardiner Museum of Ceramic Art, The Royal Conservatory of Music, the defunct McLaughlin Planetarium, and the northeast corner of the University of Toronto (which includes Trinity College, Victoria University, St. Michael's College, the Faculty of Law, and the Faculty of Music).

Surface connections 

A transfer is required to connect between the subway system and these surface routes:

TTC routes serving the station include:

References

External links

Line 1 Yonge–University stations
Railway stations in Canada opened in 1963
1963 establishments in Ontario
Royal Ontario Museum
Railway stations in Canada at university and college campuses